The Empire Strikes Back is a 1980 film in the Star Wars saga. It may also refer to:

Star Wars media
The Empire Strikes Back (novel), the 1980 novelization of the film, written by Donald F. Glut
The Empire Strikes Back (soundtrack), the film's soundtrack
The Empire Strikes Back, a 1983 radio adaptation of the film
Star Wars: The Empire Strikes Back (1982 video game), an Atari 2600 game
Star Wars: The Empire Strikes Back (1985 video game), an arcade game
Star Wars: The Empire Strikes Back (1992 video game), a 1992 side-scrolling action game for the Nintendo Entertainment System and Game Boy
Super Star Wars: The Empire Strikes Back, a 1993 side-scrolling action game for the Super NES
The Empire Strikes Back (pinball), a pinball machine released in 1980 by Hankin

Other 
The Empire Strikes Back: Race and Racism in 70s Britain, a 1982 book co-authored by Paul Gilroy
The Empire Strikes Back (Country Teasers album), 2006
"The Empire Strikes Back: A Posttranssexual Manifesto", a 1987 essay by American academic theorist Sandy Stone
The Falklands War, as popularly dubbed by American media outlets